Elections for the Pennsylvania State Senate were held on November 8, 2022, with 25 of 50 districts being contested. The term of office for those elected in 2022 will begin when the Senate convenes in January 2023. Pennsylvania State Senators are elected for four-year terms, with half of the seats up for election every two years.  The election coincided with the 2022 United States Senate election in Pennsylvania, United States House of Representatives elections, and the entirety of the Pennsylvania House of Representatives.

Republicans have controlled the chamber since the 1994 election ( years).

Special elections

5th senatorial district 
In the 2021 elections, Democratic state senator John Sabatina was elected as a judge on the Court of Common Pleas in Philadelphia and resigned his seat on December 31. On January 10, Democrats selected ward leader Shawn Dillon as their nominee. Republicans selected Sam Oropeza. Shawn Dillon withdrew from the race after facing a legal challenge due to missing candidate filing paperwork, he was replaced on the ballot by his younger brother and School District of Philadelphia grant compliance monitor Jimmy Dillon. A special election was held on May 17; Dillon won with nearly 57% of the vote.

Results summary

Redistricting 
Due to redistricting after the 2020 United States census, senators were drawn into new districts.

Retiring incumbents

Democrats 
No Democratic incumbents retired in this cycle.

Independents 
District 14: John Yudichak retired.

Republicans 
District 6: Tommy Tomlinson retired.
District 24: Bob Mensch retired.
District 34: Jake Corman retired to run for governor of Pennsylvania.
District 40: Mario Scavello retired.

Incumbents defeated in primary

Republicans 

 District 16: Pat Browne lost renomination to Jarrett Coleman.

Primary elections

Democratic primary

Republican Primary

General election

Predictions

Overview

Close races
Six district races had winning margins of less than 15%:

District breakdown

See also 

 2022 Pennsylvania elections
 Elections in Pennsylvania

References

External links 

 
 
 
  (State affiliate of the U.S. League of Women Voters)

Senate
2022
Pennsylvania Senate